Aviere ("Airman") was one of seventeen s, built for the  (Royal Italian Navy) in the late 1930s and early 1940s.

Design and description
The Soldati-class destroyers were slightly improved versions of the preceding . Their wartime complement during was 206 officers and enlisted men.

Aviere was powered by two Parsons geared steam turbines, each driving one propeller shaft using steam supplied by three Yarrow boilers.

Avieres main battery consisted of four 50-caliber  guns in two twin-gun turrets, one each fore and aft of the superstructure. On a platform amidships was a 15-caliber 120-millimeter star shell gun. Anti-aircraft (AA) defense for the Soldatis was provided by eight  Breda Model 1935 guns. The ships were equipped with six  torpedo tubes in two triple mounts amidships. Although they were not provided with a sonar system for anti-submarine work, they were fitted with a pair of depth charge throwers. The ships could carry 48 mines.

Construction and career

Aviere, built at the OTO shipyard in Livorno, was laid down on 16 January 1937, launched on 19 September 1937 and completed on 31 August 1938.

On 11 June Aviere and her sister ships carried out a reconnaissance mission in the Sicilian Channel, and on 19 June they carried supplies from Augusta to Benghazi, Libya.

On 9 July Aviere and her division participated in the Battle of Calabria; in the final phase of the battle the 11th Destroyer Division was ordered to attack the Mediterranean Fleet with torpedoes and did so (overall, ten torpedoes were launched), but scored no hits.

On 16 December Aviere took part in another large convoy operation to Libya, which was successful, and participated in the First Battle of Sirte.

Between January and March 1942 Aviere participated in the escorts of four more large convoy operations to Libya, "M. 43", "T. 18", "K. 7" and "V. 5", that were successful, with the only loss of the transport Victoria, sunk by Fairey Albacore torpedo bombers on 24 January.

Between September and December 1942 Aviere carried out a number of escort and transport missions between Italy and North Africa.

References

Bibliography

External links
 Aviere (1937) Marina Militare website

Soldati-class destroyers
Ships built in Livorno
Ships built by OTO Melara
1937 ships
World War II destroyers of Italy
Maritime incidents in December 1942
Ships sunk by British submarines